Thunder Mountain is located in the northern part of the Great Western Divide, a sub-range of the Sierra Nevada in California. Thunder pass, on the mountains east side, has an elevation of 12,720+ feet (3 877+ m). This pass marks the western end of the Kings-Kern Divide.

The mountain was named by George R. Davis, a topographer with the United States Geological Survey. He made the first ascent, in August 1905, to establish a benchmark on the summit.
The name appears on the Mt. Whitney, USGS 30 minute topographic map of 1905,
and was officially recognized by the Board on Geographic Names in 1928.

References

Mountains of Kings Canyon National Park
Mountains of Sequoia National Park
Mountains of Tulare County, California
Mountains of Northern California